Al Bano and Romina Power are an Italian-American pop music duo formed in 1975 by then-married couple Italian tenor Albano Carrisi and American singer Romina Power, the daughter of Hollywood actor Tyrone Power. They have recorded over 22 albums, which have sold in 150 million copies across six decades. Their best known international hits include "Felicità", "Sharazan", "Tu, soltanto tu (Mi hai fatto innamorare)", "Ci sarà", "Sempre sempre", and "Libertà!". They participated twice in Eurovision Song Contest in 1976 and 1985 and performed five times at Sanremo Music Festival, winning in 1984 with the song "Ci sarà". The couple also shot seven films, based on their songs, between 1967 and 1984. The two separated and divorced in 1999, but reunited professionally in 2013.

Career
Albano Carrisi met Romina Power, daughter of American actor Tyrone Power, during the filming of the movie Nel sole, named after one of his songs, in 1967. He had already released a number of solo recordings and she by then had appeared in several Italian films. The two married in 1970 in Cellino San Marco. Their debut single, "Storia di due innamorati", was released the same year by the labels La voce del padrone and Odeon, and went on to become a minor hit in Italy. The song appeared on Al Bano's solo album A cavallo di due stili. Power also released three solo albums between 1969 and 1974.

In 1975, the couple released their first album as a duo, Atto I (also known as Dialogo and Arena blanca, mar azul), which included popular song "Dialogo". In 1976, they represented Italy at the Eurovision Song Contest with the song "We'll Live It All Again", sung in Italian and English, and finished seventh. They also recorded the song in Spanish and in French, as "Viviremos todo de nuevo" and "T'aimer encore une fois", respectively. The duo then made several recordings in French, including hits "Des nuits entières" and "Enlacés sur le sable" (French version of "Prima notte d'amore").

In 1981, they released the single "Sharazan", which went on to become their breakthrough international hit, and released a Spanish language album. In 1982, the duo broke Italian records by having four songs on the Italian hit parade at the same time. The same year, they participated in the Sanremo Music Festival with the song "Felicità", and finished second. The song became widely popular, selling in over 6 million copies and receiving "German Golden Globe 1982".  It appeared on their next album, Felicità (released as Aria pura in some territories), which was a chart success. The album was also recorded in Spanish and released as Felicidad. The duo would maintain the tradition of recording Spanish versions of their albums in the following years.

Al Bano and Romina released yet one more album in 1982, Che angelo sei, with another big hit "Tu, soltanto tu (Mi hai fatto innamorare)". Their 1983 compilation Amore mio was met with a great commercial success in German-speaking countries. In 1984, they won the Sanremo Music Festival with the song "Ci sarà" from their album Effetto amore, gathering over 2 million votes. In 1985, they participated in the Eurovision Song Contest for the second and final time, with the song "Magic Oh Magic" and, again, took the seventh place.

In 1986, Al Bano and Romina Power signed a contract with WEA and recorded the album Sempre sempre, which confirmed their international success. The song "Settembre" featured the voice of their baby daughter Cristel, while for "Lord Byron" they used recordings of Byron's poetry by Tyrone Power. In 1987, they participated in the Sanremo Festival with the song "Nostalgia canaglia" and came third. The album Libertà! was released in the same year. The couple's daughter Ylenia sang a duet with Romina in "Abbi fede". In 1988, the couple released the album Fragile, and the following year, took part in Sanremo Music Festival with the song "Cara terra mia", placing at the third position. The single was a minor chart hit in Italy.

In 1990, they released the album Fotografia di un momento, with the successful single "Donna per amore", followed by the Christmas album Weihnachten bei uns zu Hause released in Germany, which later appeared in Italy as Corriere di Natale. In 1991, Al Bano and Romina Power participated in the Sanremo Music Festival for the fifth and final time as a duo, this time around with the song "Oggi sposi", placing at the eighth position. In the same year, they celebrated 25 years of their joint artistic career and released two greatest hits anthologies: Le più belle canzoni (in Italy) and Vincerai (in Europe). They also wrote an autobiography and released a video, both entitled Autoritratto dalla A alla R.

Their daughter Ylenia Carrisi disappeared under mysterious circumstances in 1994 in New Orleans, which prompted Al Bano and Romina to withdraw from touring in order to dedicate themselves to the search for their daughter. Her case remains unsolved. In 1995, the couple released their last studio album together, Emozionale, followed by a video version, Una vita emozionale. In 1996, Al Bano participated solo in the Sanremo Music Festival, singing "È la mia vita", while Romina took part in the television mini-series The Return of Sandokan. Together, they released the compilation Ancora... Zugabe. In 1997, he released a solo album Concerto classico, and she published a book about her father, entitled Cercando mio padre in 1998.

In 1999, the couple separated. In an open letter to the weekly magazine Oggi, Al Bano explained the reasons for their break-up as related to the disappearance of their daughter. The two reunited in 2013, reportedly only on a professional basis, for a concert performance in Moscow (their first live performance together in sixteen years). They continued to perform live as a duo in 2014 and 2015, including at Sanremo 2015.

Discography

Studio albums

Compilation albums

Singles

Filmography
Nel sole, directed by Aldo Grimaldi (1967)
L'oro del mondo, directed by Aldo Grimaldi (1968) 
Il suo nome è Donna Rosa, directed by Ettore Maria Fizzarotti (1969)
Pensando a te, directed by Aldo Grimaldi (1969)
Mezzanotte d'amore, directed by Ettore Maria Fizzarotti (1970)
Angeli senza paradiso, directed by Ettore Maria Fizzarotti (1970)
Champagne in paradiso, directed by Aldo Grimaldi (1984)

References

 

 

Italian musical duos
Italian pop music groups
Pop music duos
Male–female musical duos
Eurovision Song Contest entrants of 1976
Eurovision Song Contest entrants of 1985
Eurovision Song Contest entrants for Italy